Colin Mark Patrick (21 October 1893 – 7 January 1942) was a British Conservative Party politician.

He was elected at the 1931 general election as Member of Parliament (MP) for the Tavistock division of Devon, and held the seat until his death in 1942, aged 48.

References

External links 
 

1893 births
1942 deaths
Conservative Party (UK) MPs for English constituencies
UK MPs 1931–1935
UK MPs 1935–1945
Members of the Parliament of the United Kingdom for Tavistock